Melanopelta is an extinct genus of Triassic temnospondyl amphibians known from the Yarenga River, Russia.

See also
 Prehistoric amphibian
 List of prehistoric amphibians

References

Plagiosauridae
Triassic temnospondyls of Europe
Fossil taxa described in 1967